Municipal annexation is the legal process by which a city or other municipality acquires land as its jurisdictional territory (as opposed to simply owning the land the way individuals do). In the United States and Canada, it refers to the incorporation of one polity by another, usually adjacent and larger, and usually by vote of the residents involved. For example, in 1872, the city Zanesville, Ohio annexed the adjacent community of Putnam, and in 1889, the city of Toronto annexed the adjacent town of Parkdale.

Overview
Within areas that are subdivided noncontiguously, annexation can take place whereby a lower-tier municipality can annex territory under the jurisdiction of a higher-tier municipality, or tiers do not exist a local municipality can annex territory from another local municipality. The rules that govern municipal annexations in absorption of neighbouring territory vary by country. For example, in the United States, incorporated cities and towns often expand their boundaries by annexing unincorporated land adjacent to them. Municipalities can also entirely annex and be entirely annexed by other municipalities, though this is less common in the United States. Laws governing the ability and the extent municipalities can expand in this fashion are defined by the individual states' constitutions.

Annexation of neighbouring communities occurs in Canada. The City of Calgary, for example, has in the past annexed the communities of Bridgeland, Riverside, Sunnyside, Hillhurst, Hunter, Hubalta, Ogden, Forest Lawn, Midnapore, Shepard, Montgomery, and Bowness. Another example of an annexation in Canada occurred when the city of London, Ontario annexed Wortley Village in 1890.

See also
 Merger (politics)
 Municipal annexation in the United States

References

Municipal
Political geography
Local government
Mergers of administrative divisions